CKEditor (formerly known as FCKeditor) is a WYSIWYG rich text editor which enables writing content directly inside of web pages or online applications. Its core code is written in JavaScript and it is developed by CKSource. CKEditor is available under open source and commercial licenses.

History

FCKeditor and CKEditor 3 
The first version of CKEditor, under the name FCKeditor, was released in March 2003 by Frederico Caldeira Knabben, the creator of the editor and the project's Benevolent Dictator for Life. After reaching more than 3 million downloads, FCKeditor was completely reviewed and redesigned into CKEditor 3, with special attention given to performance, accessibility and a new UI.

CKEditor 4 
In December 2012, CKEditor 4 was released with an Inline Editing solution, reformatted source code, enhanced DOM and CSS performance. The server-side implementations were removed.

CKEditor 5 
After five years, in 2018, CKEditor 5 first stable version was introduced. With its code rewritten from scratch,  CKEditor 5 has a custom data model and architecture. The editor implements Operational Transformation for the tree-structured model as well as many other mechanisms which were required to create a real-time collaborative UX.

CKEditor 5 is a JavaScript framework offering a rich API to develop any editing solution. CKEditor 5 also offers builds, which are ready-to-use editors; there are currently 5 builds available to download: Classic, Inline, Balloon, Balloon block and Document.

CKEditor Ecosystem 

In October 2017, CKSource launched the CKEditor Ecosystem. As of 2022 it consists of the following products:
 CKEditor 4.
 CKEditor 5 Builds and CKEditor 5 Framework.
 CKBox, a standalone and integrated image upload and management service.
 CKEditor Cloud Services, a cloud platform with editing features and real-time collaboration services.

Features
CKEditor 4 has features found in desktop word processors such as styles formatting (bold, italic, underline, bulleted and numbered lists), tables, block quoting, web resource linking, safe undo function, image inserting, paste from Word and other common HTML formatting tools. Also CKEditor 4 has built-in spell checker functionality provided as plug-ins by WebSpellChecker LLC. By default, it is available for free with a banner ad.[6] It checks the spelling of the text and marks all errors with a red wavy line and allows the user to choose one of the correct suggestions.

There are currently many plugins available with CKEditor 4 to serve different needs, e.g. CKFinder and Accessibility Checker (the CKSource's plugins). CKFinder is a file manager for including files and images within content created with the editors. It is compatible with both CKEditor 4 and 5 and is available under commercial license.

Accessibility Checker is available under both Open Source and commercial licenses.

Real-time collaborative editing 

CKEditor 5's architecture and custom data model makes it possible to enable real-time collaborative editing.

A custom collaborative solution can be built by using the CKEditor 5 Framework components and real-time collaborative editing can be enabled by connecting to the CKEditor Cloud Services.

A ready to use, drop-in component based on CKEditor 5 (Letters) offers a complete solution for real-time collaborative writing.

Browser compatibility
CKEditor 4 is fully compatible with most internet browsers, including latest stable releases from Google Chrome, Firefox, Safari, Microsoft Edge, Opera and Internet Explorer 10 and 11. In mobile environments, it has close to full support in Safari (iOS6 +) and Chrome (Android).

CKEditor 5 is also compatible with Google Chrome, Firefox, Safari, Opera and Microsoft Edge. However, it does not support Internet Explorer 11 yet.

References

External links

 CKSource Official Website 
 CKEditor 4 GitHub repository
 CKEditor 5 GitHub repository

Free text editors
Free HTML editors
JavaScript-based HTML editors
Joomla extensions
Drupal